Volodymyr Parkhomenko (born 17 October 1957) is a Ukrainian football coach and a former player.

Since the Russian occupation of eastern Ukraine, Parkhomenko has been coaching football teams on occupied territories.

References

External links
 

1957 births
Living people
Sportspeople from Mariupol
Soviet footballers
Ukrainian footballers
FC Dynamo Saint Petersburg players
FC Dynamo Kirov players
FC Mariupol players
FC Shakhtar Donetsk players
FC Guria Lanchkhuti players
Ukrainian expatriate footballers
Expatriate footballers in Hungary
FC Metalurh Zaporizhzhia players
FC Lokomotiv Nizhny Novgorod players
FC Kryvbas Kryvyi Rih players
FC Karpaty Mukacheve players
Diósgyőri VTK players
FC Shakhtar Makiivka players
FC Aton Donetsk players
Ukrainian football managers
Association football midfielders
FC Mashynobudivnyk Druzhkivka
FC Spartak Sumy managers